Circumstellar dust is cosmic dust around a star. It can be in the form of a spherical shell or a disc, e.g. an accretion disk. Circumstellar dust can be responsible for significant extinction and is usually the source of an infrared excess for stars that have it. For some evolved stars on the asymptotic giant branch, the dust is composed of silicate emissions while others contain the presence of other dust components. According to a study, it is still uncertain whether the dust is a result of crystalline silicate or polycyclic aromatic hydrocarbon. However, recent observations revealed that Vega-type stars display broad silicate emission. It is suggested that the circumstellar dust components can depend on the evolutionary stage of a star and is related to the changes in its physical conditions.

The motion of circumstellar dust is governed by forces due to stellar gravity and radiation pressure.

Circumstellar dust in the Solar System causes the zodiacal light.

See also 

 Accretion disc
 Circumplanetary disk
 Circumstellar envelope
 Tabby's Star − oddly dimming star
 List of stars that have unusual dimming periods
 WD 1145+017 - star destroying planetesimal, producing a dusty disk

Sources

References

Stellar astronomy

Cosmic dust